Awaking Beauty is a 2008 musical with words by Alan Ayckbourn and music by Denis King. It was shown as the Stephen Joseph Theatre's Christmas production, but, unlike earlier productions, was expressly billed as not suitable for young children. The musical is a parody sequel to Sleeping Beauty, where the wicked witch Carabosse also falls in love with the prince, and uses her own dark magic and dirty tricks to try to make him her own.

References

External links
 Official website

2008 plays
2008 musicals
Plays by Alan Ayckbourn
Plays based on European myths and legends
Musicals based on secular traditions
Fiction about witchcraft
British musicals